Gaspard de Diano or Gaspare de Diano (1389–1451) was a Roman Catholic prelate who served as Archbishop of Naples (1438–1451),
 
Archbishop of Conza (1422–1438),
and Bishop of Teano (1412–1422).

Biography
Gaspard de Diano was born in 1389.
On 30 June 1412, he was appointed during the papacy of Pope Gregory XII as Bishop of Teano.
On 20 May 1422, he was appointed during the papacy of Pope Martin V as Archbishop of Conza.
On 21 February 1438, he was appointed during the papacy of Pope Eugene IV as Archbishop of Naples.
He served as Archbishop of Naples until his death on 29 April 1451.

Episcopal succession
While bishop, he was the principal consecrator of:
Antonio Scorbillo, Bishop of Mileto (1437); and
Basilio Maupretis, Titular Bishop of Tanis (1439).

References

External links and additional sources
 (for Chronology of Bishops) 
 (for Chronology of Bishops) 
 (for Chronology of Bishops) 
 (for Chronology of Bishops) 
 (for Chronology of Bishops) 
 (for Chronology of Bishops) 

15th-century Italian Roman Catholic archbishops
Bishops appointed by Pope Gregory XII
Bishops appointed by Pope Martin V
Bishops appointed by Pope Eugene IV
1389 births
1451 deaths
Archbishops of Sant'Angelo dei Lombardi-Conza-Nusco-Bisaccia